Aegoidus is a genus of beetles in the family Cerambycidae, containing the following species:

 Aegoidus calligrammus Bates, 1885
 Aegoidus debauvei (Guérin-Méneville, 1838)
 Aegoidus earlii Guérin-Méneville, 1840
 Aegoidus pacificus Tippmann, 1960
 Aegoidus peruvianus Buquet, 1838
 Aegoidus weyrauchi Tippmann, 1953

References

Trachyderini
Cerambycidae genera